i-D is a British bimonthly magazine published by Vice Media, dedicated to fashion, music, art and youth culture. i-D was founded by designer and former Vogue art director Terry Jones in 1980. The first issue was published in the form of a hand-stapled fanzine with text produced on a typewriter. Over the years the magazine evolved into a mature glossy but it has kept street style and youth culture central.

i-D has also held exhibitions worldwide and published several books.

Details
The magazine is known for its innovative photography and typography and as a training ground for fresh talent. Photographers Wolfgang Tillmans, Mario Testino, Terry Richardson, Craig McDean, Nick Knight and Juergen Teller started their careers at i-D, as did Dylan Jones and Caryn Franklin. Other photographers that have contributed to i-D include Ellen von Unwerth, Robert Fairer and Kayt Jones.

People who have appeared in i-D include Madonna, Grace Jones, Naomi Campbell, Sade, John Galliano, Alexander McQueen, Kanye West, Helmut Lang, Franz Ferdinand, Chloë Sevigny, Raf Simons, Jun Takahashi, Veronique Branquinho, Lily Cole, Giles Deacon, Dizzee Rascal, Scarlett Johansson, Rick Owens, Selena Gomez, and Rihanna.

The wink and smile on each front cover—a graphic representation of the magazine's logo—are integral to the i-D identity.

In November 2021, Max Clark, the magazine's fashion editor, was suspended after more than a dozen women accused him of sending sexually inappropriate messages. Clark denies the allegations.

The Straight Up
The Straight-Up is a documentary style of photography pioneered by Terry Jones, founder and editor-in-chief of i-D magazine, in 1977. Taking its name from a West Country expression meaning 'tell it like it is', a Straight-Up typically captures a head-to-toe portrait of someone street cast with great personal style, often accompanied by a short question-and-answer defining their life, likes and dislikes.

In 1977, inspired by August Sander's social documentary portraits and Irving Penn's Small Trade series, Jones commissioned British photographer Steve Johnston to photograph London punks head-to-toe against a plain white wall on the Kings Road. Jones intended the pictures to run as a cultural piece in British Vogue, where he then worked as art director. The photographs however were considered too revolutionary, so Jones ran the images in a book he was art directing called Not Another Punk Book, published by Aurum Press. These Straight-Ups went on to form the basis of i-D, a hand-stapled fanzine founded by Jones in 1980. As i-D grew from a fanzine into a fashion magazine, the Straight-Up style of photography continued, culminating in an entire issue of the magazine dedicated to the photographic style in August 2003 (The Straight-Up Issue, No. 234). Today Straight-Ups continue to be featured in i-D.

Editors
The editors of i-D have been:
 Terry Jones (1980–Present)
 Dylan Jones (1986–1988)
 Caryn Franklin (1986–1988)
 Alix Sharkey (1988–1989)
 John Godfrey (1988–1990)
 Matthew Collin (1991–1994)
 Avril Mair (1994–2005)
 Glenn Waldron (2005–2006)
 Ben Reardon (2006–2010)
 Holly Shackleton (2010–2019)
 Alastair McKimm (2019–present)

Publications
A Decade of i-Deas, the Encyclopaedia of the '80s. Compiled and Produced by i-D Magazine. Edited by John Godfrey. London: Penguin, 1990. .
Family Future Positive. Terry and Tricia Jones, and Avril Mair. London: i-D, 1998. .
SMILE i-D. Fashion and Style. 20 years of i-D magazine. Terry Jones. London: i-D / Cologne: Taschen, 2000. .
Fashion Now. i-D selects the world's 150 most important designers. Terry Jones and Avril Mair. Cologne: Taschen, 2003. .
Fashion Now 2. i-D selects the world's 160 most important designers. Terry Jones and Susie Rushton. Cologne: Taschen, 2005. .
Safe+Sound. Terry and Tricia Jones. London: i-D, 2007. .

Exhibitions

Smile i-D. Initially launched in 2001 for i-Ds 20th birthday, Smile i-D highlighted the spirit of the magazine. Since then, the show toured internationally, growing with each destination to include new material. Wapping Hydraulic Power Station, London, April 2001; Armani flagship store, Milan, June 2001; Espace Cardin, Paris, October 2001; Art Directors Club, New York, November 2001; El Dorrego, Buenos Aires, October/November 2003; Laboratorio Arte Alameda, Mexico City, February 2004; Museo Nacional de Bellas Artes, Santiago, Chile, April 2004; Corp Banca, Caracas, July 2004; "+7.095.Art" gallery, Moscow, April 2007.
i-Dentity. The exhibition focused on identity, using still images, film, sound and smell. Fashion and Textile Museum, London, October 2005 (For i-D's 25th anniversary) then toured to New York, February 2006; Hong Kong, April 2006; Tokyo, April 2006; Beijing, May 2006.
Safe+Sound. London College of Fashion, London, February 2007; CP Company, Milan, April 2007.

See also
 List of people on the cover of i-D magazine

References

Further reading
 Taylor, Steve & Brody, Neville. 100 Years of Magazine Covers. London: Black Dog Publishing, 2006. .

External links
 
 

1980 establishments in England
Bi-monthly magazines published in the United Kingdom
Fashion magazines published in the United Kingdom
Independent magazines
Lifestyle magazines published in the United Kingdom
Magazines published in London
Magazines established in 1980
Vice Media